The Arab arch (Spanish: Puerta Árabe) is an arch located in Ágreda, Spain. It was built in horseshoe style. It was declared Bien de Interés Cultural in 1931.

History 
This arch is one of the only two surviving entries to medieval Ágreda. It was built in the 10th century, at the same time as the rest of the Arabic citywall, which originally had four gates.

References 

Bien de Interés Cultural landmarks in the Province of Soria
Arches and vaults in Spain